Diamond Island is a low granite island, with an area of 6.76 ha, in Tasmania, south-eastern Australia. 

It is just off the town of Bicheno.  It is sometimes connected to the mainland by a sand spit.  It is a nature reserve.

Fauna
Recorded breeding seabird and wader species are little penguin and sooty oystercatcher.

References

Islands of Tasmania
Protected areas of Tasmania